Firaq partug is the traditional clothing of Afghanistan. It had also traditionally been worn by Afghan Pashtuns in khyber Pakhtunkhwa, present-day Pakistan, before the Treaty of Gandamak in 1879, when the area was left to India under British control. The traditional clothing has since been spread to other regions of Pakistan following the Partition of India in 1947. The styles vary according to region. The outfits consists of three garments: chador, firaq and partug. The word Firaq partug comes from pashto. Firaq means a flared shirt and partug means pants.

Chador
The chador is the head scarf which can be of varying lengths.

Firaq
Firaq refers to the upper garment which flows out from the waist, like a skirt, with some styles reaching to the ankles and other styles reaching below the knees. The firaq is also called qameez.

Partug
Partug is a type of shalwar and is the lower garment which is baggy, gathered at the ankles and tied around the waist creating folds.

Photo gallery

References

Afghan clothing